Animal welfare in Egypt is a neglected issue. There are only a few organizations that support the rights and wellbeing of animals.

Issues 
There are a lot of problems concerning animal rights in Egypt. People are not properly educated about it and there are no strict laws against animal cruelty, such cases like drowning puppies, burying kittens alive or banging animals' heads against walls go unnoticed.

Working donkeys 
There are donkeys that are mistreated in the streets of Egypt where they are overworked and abused with whips or sticks and are malnourished. A study has shown that the population of donkeys in Egypt has fluctuated over the span of 30 years from 1966 to 1996. In 1966 the population was 1,162; in 1976 it was 1,568; in 1986 it was 1,879 and in 1996 it was 1,690.

Alexandria Zoo 

Alexandria Zoo has been a source of poor animal welfare reports in recent years. Reports of animal abuse, including hitting and tight living quarters, and public littering have often been in the news.

In February 2015, two men entered Alexandria Zoo and beat up hamadryas baboons with sticks as dozens of zoo goers watched and laughed. Most of the monkeys fled to the top of the enclosure for safety. Several others endured beating by the men as people in the crowd cheered, laughed and clapped.

The two men spent a considerable amount of time in the monkey enclosure and no security at the zoo intervened. Eventually, the men left the scene un-apprehended and without suffering any consequences.

Effects of political turmoil 
After the January 25 revolution, tourism in Egypt came to a halt. Because that was the only source of income for those who worked at tourist attractions, they were unable to care for their animals and as a result, they were suffering. The Egyptian Society of Animal Friends (ESAF) was able to feed 700 horses, veterinary care was provided, nosebands and fly masks were distributed. In four days, 526 animals were fed and ultimately 1,857 horses and donkeys and 94 camels were tended to using the aid of the Humane Society International (HSI).

Stray animal culling 

Stray animals like cats and dogs are all around the streets of Egypt. A dedicated animal lover reached out to PETA Asia Pacific in February 2015 and they started a petition called "Urge Egypt to Stop Cruel Cull of Dogs!" where the messages would be sent straight to the governor of Cairo, the governor of Giza and the Minister of Agriculture. S.P.A.R.E has encouraged people via their Facebook page in July 2014 to adopt stray "balady" dogs to save them from being culled.

Another ongoing petition has been launched by Occupy For Animals on Change.org in January 2013 to stop the poisoning and shooting of street animals. In March 2015, the Veterinary Directorate of Minya and Suez ruled a mass cull of all the stray dogs. According to El Watan News, they have put down 133 dogs in Minya.

The Ahram Street dog 
In February 2015, a dog in Qaliubeya's governorate - Shubra El-Khayma - was brutally slaughtered by three men after the dog bit one of them. They were threatening to press charges against the owner and came to the deal of killing the dog as an act of redeeming honor and dropping the charges in return. The story went viral after a graphic video of the slaughter on Facebook was posted, sending animal rights activists into a rage. The three men, two of whom are butchers, were arrested days after the incident. The owner, along with the three defendants was sentenced to three years in prison. A Cairo appeal court reduced the sentence.

Fatima Naoot 
In 2016, Egyptian poet Fatima Naoot was convicted of "contempt of religion" and sentenced to three years in jail for a 2014 Facebook post criticising animal killing during Eid.

The Matareya dog 
In December, 2019 a horrific video clip went viral across social media showing four people torturing a dog in a Tuk-Tuk by striking it with large knives, leaving long deep slashes across the body as the dog yelps in agony and finally succumbs to death. The incident took place in al-Matareya suburb of Cairo, and immediately sparked outrage online. As a result, four people were arrested for torturing and killing the dog.

Notable animal welfare organisations 
 The Animal Care in Egypt organization (ACE) was founded by Kim Taylor and Julie Wartenberg. It is based in Luxor and provides free veterinary care and education.
 The Animal Welfare of Luxor (AWOL) is a UK registered charity on the West bank of Luxor that focusses on educating children in proper animal healthcare and treatment.
 The Donkey Sanctuary is operating from Giza in three mobile clinics.
 The Egyptian Mau Rescue Organization (EMRO) was formed in 2004 as a non-governmental organization (NGO) that is dedicated to rescuing Mau cats, the descendants of the Ancient Egyptian sacred cat.
 The Egyptian Society for Mercy to Animals (ESMA) was founded in 2007 as a non-profit organization.
 The Sharm Action For Animals (S.A.F.A) was founded in 2011 to help and rescue stray animals on the streets of Sharm El-Sheikh.
 The Society for Protection of Animal Rights in Egypt (S.P.A.R.E.) was founded in 2001 by Amina Abaza and Dina Zulfikar. In November 2013, Abaza fought for the rights of animals by proposing a law to prevent animal cruelty. The legislation passed and Article 45 was introduced in the Egyptian Constitution as: "The State shall protect its seas, shores, lakes, waterways and natural protectorates. Trespassing, polluting or misusing any of them is prohibited. Every citizen is guaranteed the right of enjoying them. The State shall protect and develop the green space in the urban areas; preserve plant, animal and fish resources and protect those under the threat of extinction or danger; guarantee humane treatment of animals, all according to the law." A new legislation is being proposed after a previous one was refused that would stipulate compassion and mercy.

References 

 
Environment of Egypt
Fauna of Egypt